The Teva Championship was an annual golf tournament for professional women golfers on the Futures Tour, the LPGA Tour's developmental tour. The event has been played since 2007 in the Cincinnati, Ohio area.

The title sponsor was Teva Pharmaceuticals, the parent company of Duramed, which was the overall sponsor of the Futures Tour. Prior to 2010, the tournament was known as The Duramed Championship.

The tournament was a 54-hole event, as are most Futures Tour tournaments, and included pre-tournament pro-am opportunities, in which local amateur golfers could play with the professional golfers from the tour as a benefit for local charities. The benefiting charity of the Teva Championship was the National Multiple Sclerosis Society Ohio Valley Chapter.

Winners

Tournament records

References

External links
Futures Tour official website

Former Symetra Tour events
Golf in Ohio
Sports competitions in Cincinnati
Recurring sporting events established in 2007
Recurring sporting events disestablished in 2011
2007 establishments in Ohio
2011 disestablishments in Ohio